Mygatt is a surname. Notable people with the surname include:

Robertson Kirtland Mygatt (1861–1919), American landscape painter and etcher
Tracy Dickinson Mygatt (1885–1973), American writer and pacifist

See also
Myatt